The canton of Ancenis-Saint-Géréon (before 2021: Ancenis) is an administrative division of the Loire-Atlantique department, western France. Its borders were modified at the French canton reorganisation which came into effect in March 2015. Its seat is in Ancenis-Saint-Géréon.

It consists of the following communes:
 
Ancenis-Saint-Géréon
Couffé
Loireauxence
Mésanger
Montrelais
Oudon
Pannecé
Le Pin
Pouillé-les-Côteaux
La Roche-Blanche
Vair-sur-Loire
Vallons-de-l'Erdre

References

Cantons of Loire-Atlantique